Pinot simple flic is a French crime-comedy film directed by Gérard Jugnot and released in 1984.

Plot 
The film starts in the 13th arrondissement of Paris in 1984. Robert Pinot is a police officer as ordinary as clumsy. One day, he stops a certain Josyane, a young drug addict who is also doubled as a pickpocket, nicknamed Marylou. Having discovered that she comes from the same village, Nanteuil, then him, he takes compassion for the young girl and decides to take her under his wing to keep her away from Tony, a dangerous dealer with whom she is in love.

Cast 
 Gérard Jugnot as Robert Pinot
 Fanny Bastien as Josyane Krawczyk / Marylou
 Patrick Fierry as Tony
 Pierre Mondy as Rochu
 Jean-Claude Brialy as Morcy
 Jean Rougerie as Vaudreuil
 Gérard Loussine as Blanchard
 Claire Magnin as Craquette
 Jean-Claude Islert as Grimaldi
 Dane Porret as Ferrand
 Alain Doutey as Jeoffroy
 Pascal Légitimus as Tom
 Raymond Aquilon as Dom
 Carole Jacquinot as Ziton
 Sim as Vénus, the photographer
 Christophe Clark (dubbed by Martin Lamotte) as Cricri (uncredited)
 Brigitte Verbecq as Brigitte (uncredited)
 Pierre Frag as Bertrand, the owner patron of the sex-shop
 Jean-Claude Bouillaud as the policeman in the bus
 Philippe Klébert as the thug
 Didier Kaminka as the tramp
 Patrice Leconte as the man with glasses in the metro
 Charles Nemes as the drunk man in the prison
 Jean-Marie Poiré as the man with walkman in the metro

About the film 
 It is the first film directed by Gérard Jugnot, who will direct Scout toujours... the next year.
 The film poster is a parody of First Blood, where Gérard Jugnot appears at the middle of the picture with torn clothes, a band on the cap and holding an M60 machine gun like Sylvester Stallone.
 The following film directors briefly appeared in the film :
 Charles Nemes (Heroes Are Not Wet Behind the Ears) as the drunk man who repetitively shouts "présent" in the prison of the police station ;
 Patrice Leconte (French Fried Vacation) as the man in the metro bothered by the smell of Pinot ;
 Jean-Marie Poiré (Santa Claus Is a Stinker) as the man with the walkman in the metro, who does not see Pinot being aggressed at only a few meters from him.
 The film ends with a mise en abyme. Gérard Jugnot who plays Pinot is in a police van, while the vehicle starts, the plan gets bigger and the technical team, directed by Gérard Jugnot, is filming the sequence.

External links 
 
 Vehicles featured in the film on Internet Movie Cars Database

1984 films
French crime comedy films
1980s crime comedy films
National Police (France)
Films shot in Paris
1984 directorial debut films
1984 comedy films
Films directed by Gérard Jugnot
1980s French films
1980s French-language films